The Outlaw's Daughter is a novel by Australian writer Arthur Wright about bushranging.

Plot
A bushranger, Devil Devine, abandons his daughter. Years later he holds her up and tries to marry her but is stopped. The bushranger is pursued by the boyfriend of his daughter.

References

External links
The Outlaw's Daughter at AustLit
The Outlaw's Daughter at National Archives of Australia
Book serialized in Worlds News - 13 July (prologue), 13 July Ch 1, 20 July, 27 July, 3 Aug, 10 Aug, 17 Aug, 24 Aug, 31 Aug, 7 Sept, 14 Sept, 21 Sept, 28 Sept, 5 Oct, 12 Oct, 19 Oct, 26 Oct final

1919 Australian novels
Australian adventure novels
Novels set in Australia